Tyrfingur Tyrfingsson (born 1987) is an Icelandic playwright, author and director. He was educated at The Iceland Academy of the Arts until 2011, the Janáček Academy of Music and Performing Arts, and Goldsmiths University of London from 2011-2012. He was one of ten people to receive the Outstanding Young Icelanders award in 2016.

Works

 Bláskjár/Blue Eyes
 The Commercial of the Year
 Harold Pinters Silence at Reykjavik Art Festival in 2015. 
 Bláskjá for which he was awarded Grímuverðlaun.
 Kartöfluæturnar

He has been awarded and nominated in a number of categories for Grima – awards for Performing Arts in Iceland.

References

External links
 Biography
 Kvennabladid reviews
 Leikhusin news

1987 births
Living people
Icelandic dramatists and playwrights
Icelandic directors
Alumni of Goldsmiths, University of London
21st-century Icelandic writers
Janáček Academy of Music and Performing Arts alumni